Yermukhametovo (Yärmöxämät) is a rural locality (a selo) in Kandrinsky Selsoviet, Tuymazinsky District, Bashkortostan, Russia. The population was 651 as of 2010. There are 14 streets.

Geography 
Yermukhametovo is located 45 km east of Tuymazy (the district's administrative centre) by road. Nizhnyaya Karan-Yelga is the nearest rural locality.

References 

Rural localities in Tuymazinsky District